Limete is one of the 24 communes that are the administrative divisions of Kinshasa, the capital city of the Democratic Republic of the Congo.

Location 

Limete is located south of the Pool Malebo between the mouths of the Funa and Ndjili rivers.  The eastern boundary is the Ndjili going south down to Boulevard Lumumba.  The western boundary from the north follows the Funa, Boulevard Lumumba, and  Avenue de L'Université down to Avenue Kikwit.  From there the southern boundary rejoins Boulevard Lumumba to the east via Avenue Sefu and the Limete Tower interchange.

Limete's neighboring communes going clockwise from the east are: Masina, Matete, Lemba, Ngaba, Kalamu, and Barumbu.

Government 

The administration of Limete is led by an unelected government appointed burgomaster.  As of 2023 the burgomaster is Nathalie Alamba.  The reform of having burgomasters elected by communal councils awaits the inaugural election of these councils.

Electoral district  
With 295,768 on its voter rolls Limete is an electoral district for both the election of a thirteen-member communal council and that of three deputies of the Provincial Assembly of Kinshasa.  Both elections are by open list.  For the National Assembly Limete is part of the Kinshasa III district (Mont Amba).

Nationwide communal council elections were scheduled for 22 September 2019 but did not take place.  In December of that year President Tshisekedi declared that these elections would be held sometime in 2020.

The Provincial Assembly election was held as part of the general elections on 30 December 2018.  Therese Masengo Muabuanga (UDPS/Tshisekedi), Jean Désiré Mbonzi Wa Mbonzi  (MLC), and Gerard Mulumba Kongolo Wa Kongolo (UDPS/Tshisekedi) are the deputies representing Limete in the new legislature.

Administrative divisions 
In 2014 Limete was divided into the following 14 quarters:

References

Communes of Kinshasa
Mont Amba District